{{Infobox person
| name               = Wayson Choy
| birth_name         = Choy Way Sun<ref>Daniel E. Slotnik, "Wayson Choy, 80, Whose Books Are Windows on Chinese-Canadian Life, Dies". The New York Times, May 3, 2019.</ref>
| birth_date         = 
| birth_place        = Vancouver, British Columbia, Canada
| death_date         = 
| death_place        = Toronto, Ontario, Canada
| occupation         = Novelist
| nationality        = Canadian
| alma_mater         = University of British Columbia
}}

Wayson Choy  (崔維新 Pinyin: Cuī Wéixīn ; Jyutping: Ceoi1 Wai4-san1) (April 20, 1939 – April 28, 2019) was a Canadian novelist. Publishing two novels and two memoirs in his lifetime, he is considered both one of the most important pioneers of Asian Canadian literature in Canada, and an important figure in LGBT literature as one of Canada's first openly gay writers of colour to achieve widespread mainstream success.

Early life
Choy was born in Vancouver in 1939. A Chinese Canadian, he spent his childhood in the city's Chinatown. Choy graduated from Gladstone Secondary School and went on to attend the University of British Columbia, where he studied creative writing. He learned later in life that he had been adopted, which formed part of the basis for his memoir Paper Shadows.

Career
Choy published a number of short stories while studying creative writing at university, with one of his stories appearing in the annual Best American Short Stories anthology, but after graduating he devoted himself primarily to teaching, resuming writing only later in life. Choy moved to Toronto in 1962, taught English at Burnhamthorpe Collegiate  (1966–1967), then taught at Humber College from 1967 to 2004. He continued to teach at the Humber School for Writers, and served as president of the Cahoots Theatre Company.

Choy was the author of the novel The Jade Peony (1995) which won the Trillium Book Award and the City of Vancouver Book Award. In 2010, it was selected as one of five books for the CBC's annual Canada Reads competition, where it was defended by physician Samantha Nutt.

His memoir Paper Shadows: A Chinatown Childhood was published in 1999. Written about his childhood within the Chinese Canadian community in Vancouver, the book explores both his discovery that he was adopted and his process of coming to terms with being gay. It won the Edna Staebler Award for Creative Non-Fiction, and was shortlisted for the Governor General's Award for English-language non-fiction at the 1999 Governor General's Awards.

In 2001, Choy suffered an asthma attack, which led to him being placed in a medically induced coma for 11 days during which he also suffered cardiac arrest. He remained in hospital for four months to recuperate and recover with physiotherapy. In 2005, he had a second heart attack, and underwent quadruple bypass surgery.

His second novel,  All That Matters, was published in 2004, and was nominated for the Scotiabank Giller Prize. All That Matters won Choy's second Trillium Book Award in 2004.

In 2005, he was named a member of the Order of Canada.

In 2009 Choy published Not Yet: A Memoir of Living and Almost Dying, his second and final memoir about dealing with the life-threatening health challenges.

In 2015 he received the George Woodcock Award, the lifetime achievement award for writers from British Columbia presented by the Writers' Trust of Canada and the Vancouver Public Library.

Three recently published monographs have featured chapters on Choy's publications up to Not Yet; these are: John Z. Ming Chen's The Influence of Daoism on Asian-Canadian Writers (Mellen, 2008), John Z. Ming Chen and Wei Li's A Study of Canadian Social Realist Literature: Neo-Marxist, Confucian, and Daoist Approaches (Inner Mongolia University Press, 2011), John Z. Ming Chen and Yuhua Ji's Canadian-Daoist Poetics, Ethics, and Aesthetics (Springer, 2015).

 Bibliography 

 Novels The Jade Peony – 1995All That Matters – 2004

 Memoirs Paper Shadows: A Chinatown Childhood – 1999Not Yet: A Memoir of Living and Almost Dying'' – 2009

References

External links
Records of Wayson Choy are held by Simon Fraser University's Special Collections and Rare Books 

1939 births
2019 deaths
21st-century Canadian male writers
20th-century Canadian novelists
20th-century Canadian male writers
21st-century Canadian novelists
Canadian male non-fiction writers
Canadian male novelists
Canadian memoirists
Canadian people of Chinese descent
Canadian writers of Asian descent
Canadian gay writers
Harbourfront Festival Prize winners
Academic staff of Humber College
Gay memoirists
Canadian LGBT novelists
Members of the Order of Canada
Place of death missing
University of British Columbia alumni
Writers from Vancouver
Writers from Toronto
Gay novelists
21st-century Canadian LGBT people
20th-century Canadian LGBT people